Anthony Bonus is a former rugby league footballer who played in the 1990s. Bonus played for the Illawarra Steelers from 1994–95, then the Parramatta Eels in 1996 and finally the Melbourne Storm in 1998.

Playing career
Originally from Bundaberg, Bonus made his first grade debut for Illawarra in 1994 against Canterbury-Bankstown.  In 1996, Bonus joined Parramatta and made seven appearances for the club before being released at the end of the season. He would rejoin Illawarra without adding to his first grade appearances in 1997, playing in the club's second grade team.

In June 1998, Bonus played for Melbourne in the club's inaugural season making one appearance against Balmain. Bonus, who was living in Brisbane, was called into the Storm squad to replace Glenn Lazarus. While with Melbourne, Bonus played for the Norths Devils in the 1998 Queensland Cup.

References

External links
Rugby League Project profile

Living people
Australian rugby league players
Illawarra Steelers players
Parramatta Eels players
Melbourne Storm players
Norths Devils players
Year of birth missing (living people)
Rugby league players from New South Wales